Mons Latreille is a solitary lunar mountain in central Mare Crisium. This feature was named by the IAU in May 2021, after Pierre André Latreille, a French entomologist.  It rises approximately 150 m above the surrounding mare, and it is approximately 6.4 km in diameter.

The mountain is a volcanic feature similar to Isis and Osiris in Mare Serenitatis.

See also
 List of mountains on the Moon by height

References

Mountains on the Moon